The Barbourville Commercial District is a  historic district which was listed on the National Register of Historic Places in 1984.  It included 32 contributing buildings in the core of the historic downtown of Barbourville, Kentucky.

The district is roughly bounded by Daniel Boone Dr., Liberty, High, and Jail Streets.  It includes the Knox County Courthouse.

References

Barbourville, Kentucky
Courthouses in Kentucky
Historic districts on the National Register of Historic Places in Kentucky
Victorian architecture in Kentucky
National Register of Historic Places in Knox County, Kentucky